Celso Halilo de Abdul (born 28 April 1984 in Gaza Province, Mozambique) is a professional Mozambican football player who plays for El Gounah.

International career

International goals
Scores and results list Mozambique's goal tally first.

References

External links

1984 births
Living people
People from Gaza Province
Mozambican footballers
Association football defenders
GD Maputo players
El Gouna FC players
ENPPI SC players
UD Songo players
Mozambican expatriate footballers
Expatriate footballers in Kuwait
Expatriate footballers in Egypt
Mozambique international footballers
2010 Africa Cup of Nations players
Al-Sahel SC (Kuwait) players
Mozambican expatriate sportspeople in Kuwait
Mozambican expatriate sportspeople in Egypt
Kuwait Premier League players